Kochstraße is a Berlin U-Bahn station located on the .

It is close to Checkpoint Charlie and the Checkpoint Charlie Museum.

History

It was built by Grenander / Fehse in 1923. Due to a lack of money, the platform was made only 80 metres long. On 7 May 1944, there was a bomb damage in the station area on the ceiling and in the wall area. The station was closed for a few months in 1945, and from 1961 to 1990 it was the last stop in West Berlin. In 1995, the platform was lengthened by 26 metres.

Notes

External links

U6 (Berlin U-Bahn) stations
Buildings and structures in Friedrichshain-Kreuzberg
Railway stations in Germany opened in 1923